Whey cheese is a dairy product made of whey, the by-product of cheesemaking. After the production of most cheeses, about 50% of milk solids remain in the whey, including most of the lactose and lactalbumin. The production of whey cheese allows cheesemakers to use the remaining whey, instead of discarding it as a waste product.

There are two fundamentally different products made of whey and called whey cheese:
 Albumin cheese, made by coagulating the albumin in the whey with heat and possibly acid: ricotta, mizithra, and so on.
 Norwegian brown cheeses, made by boiling down the whey to concentrate the sugar, and consisting primarily of caramelized milk sugar: mysost and the like. Since these are not primarily made of coagulated milk proteins, they are technically not cheese.

Cheese and whey cheese are distinct categories in the Codex Alimentarius. In the appellation system of the European Union, protected whey cheeses are included in class 1.4 for other products of animal origin instead of class 1.3 for cheeses.

Production

Two different methods are used to produce whey cheese:
 The whey can be concentrated and then moulded. Cheeses produced with this method possess a relatively high lactose content. Typically, they have a yellowish to brown color and possess a sweet, cooked, or caramelized flavor.
 Heat can be used to coagulate the whey and optionally adds acid. This type has a relatively low lactose content and a white to yellowish color. It is possible to ripen whey cheeses made with the coagulation method.
With both methods, the whey may be pre-concentrated prior to the further concentration or coagulation of the whey. The process may also include the addition of milk, cream, or other raw materials of milk origin before or after concentration or coagulation. Depending on the production method used, whey cheeses range from soft to hard consistencies. Fresh soft varieties contain a lot of moisture and expire quickly. Ripened hard varieties have a much lower moisture content, making them preservable for much longer.

The production yield of whey cheese is generally lower than ordinary cheese because whey does not possess as many nutrients as milk. Yield is dependent on the composition of the whey, the addition of milk or cream, the production technology, and the composition (moisture content) of the final product. With efficient modern methods such as ultrafiltration, 10 to 20% of solids or more remain after the whey is mixed with cream and reduced.

Because almost all varieties generally contain significant amounts of whey, they are unsuitable for consumption by people who are lactose intolerant. Brocciu is lower in lactose.

Varieties
Whey cheese is produced all over the world. Ricotta is the most important and popular cheese of this type. It originated in Italy, but has become popular in many parts of the world.
 Anari cheese, from Cyprus
 Anthotyros, from Greece
 Breuil, from the Basque region
 Brocciu, from Corsica
 Brousse (cheese), from Provence, France
 Brunost, from Norway
 Gailtaler Almschotten, from Carinthia, Austria
 Greuilh, from the Nouvelle-Aquitaine region of France
 Lor, from Turkey
 Manouri, from Greece
 Mató, from Spain
 Mizithra, from Greece
 Primost, from Norway
 Recuite, from France
 Requeijão, from Portugal
 Ricotta, from Italy
 Rigouta, from Tunisia
 Schottenziger, from Switzerland
 Sérac, from the French and Valais Alps
 Urdă, from Romania
 Xynomizithra, from Greece
 Xynotyro, from Greece

References

External links